Laframboise is a French surname meaning "raspberry".  Most carriers of this surname descend from Joseph Frye, an English colonist from Kittery, Maine, who was captured in an Indian raid in 1695  during King William's War and taken to New France by the First Nations and was baptized into the Catholic faith in Montreal. Notable people of this surname include the following:

Donna Laframboise, Canadian feminist, writer, photographer
Magdelaine Laframboise (1780–1846), American fur trader
Mario Laframboise (born 1957), Canadian politician
Maurice Laframboise (1821–1882), Quebec lawyer, judge and political figure
Michel Laframboise (1793–1865), French Canadian fur trader in the Oregon Country
Pete Laframboise (1950–2011), Canadian professional ice hockey player

French-language surnames
Raspberry